Scirpophaga whalleyi is a moth in the family Crambidae. It was described by Angoon Lewvanich in 1981. It is found in China (Yunnan), India and Sri Lanka.

References

Moths described in 1981
Schoenobiinae
Moths of Asia
Moths of Sri Lanka